Bikah Rural District is a rural district (dehestan) in the Bikah District of Rudan County, Hormozgan Province, Iran. At the 2006 census, its population was 14,204, in 2,966 families.  The rural district has 6 villages.

References 

Rural Districts of Hormozgan Province
Rudan County